Albert Edward Kay (22 November 1895 – 1975) was an English footballer who made almost 300 appearances for Wolverhampton Wanderers.

Career
Kay spent fifteen months at Birmingham between June 1919 and November 1920.

After a short spell at Willenhall, he joined Wolverhampton Wanderers in Summer 1921, making his club debut on 2 September 1922 in a 1–1 draw at Derby County. The team were relegated to the Third Division in his first season, but made an immediate return as champions.

The defender made 295 appearances for the club in total over 10 years, before retiring due to injury in 1932, shortly after the club were promoted to the top flight.

Honours
Wolverhampton Wanderers
Second Division: 1931–32
Third Division: 1923–24

References

 

1895 births
1975 deaths
Footballers from Sheffield
English footballers
Association football defenders
Birmingham City F.C. players
Willenhall F.C. players
Wolverhampton Wanderers F.C. players
English Football League players